The Curtis Fuller Jazztet is an album by American trombonist Curtis Fuller with saxophonist Benny Golson, recorded in 1959 and released on the Savoy label.

Reception

AllMusic stated: "The Curtis Fuller Jazztet is a relaxed hard bop set featuring many of the young stars of the day."

Track listing
All compositions by Curtis Fuller, except where indicated.
 "It's All Right With Me" (Cole Porter) - 7:39     
 "Wheatleith Hall" (Dizzy Gillespie) - 14:06     
 "I'll Walk Alone" (Sammy Cahn, Jule Styne) - 6:57     
 "Arabia" - 6:36     
 "Judy's Dilemma" - 5:52

Personnel
Curtis Fuller - trombone
Benny Golson - tenor saxophone
Lee Morgan - trumpet 
Wynton Kelly - piano
Paul Chambers - bass
Charlie Persip - drums

References 

1959 albums
Savoy Records albums
Curtis Fuller albums
Albums recorded at Van Gelder Studio